The 2006 Dally M Awards were presented on Tuesday 5 September 2006 at the Sydney Town Hall in Sydney and broadcast on Fox Sports. Warren Smith presided as Master of Ceremonies, a role which he had held in previous years.

Dally M Player of the Year
Presented by prime minister John Howard 
Dally M Player of the Year
Winner:
Cameron Smith, Melbourne Storm

Player votes tally (top 10)

Special awards
Provan-Summons Medal (fan's choice for 2005's best player)
Presented by Norm Provan and Arthur Summons
Winner:
Nathan Hindmarsh, Parramatta Eels
Nominated:
Ben Kennedy, Manly Warringah Sea Eagles
Willie Mason, Canterbury Bulldogs
Andrew Johns, Newcastle Knights

Peter Moore Award for Dally M Rookie of the Year
Winner:
Jarryd Hayne, Parramatta Eels
Nominated:
Greg Eastwood, Brisbane Broncos
Darius Boyd, Brisbane Broncos
Luke Douglas, Cronulla-Sutherland Sharks

Dally M Captain of the Year
Winner:
Ben Kennedy, Manly Warringah Sea Eagles
Nominated:
Darren Lockyer, Brisbane Broncos
Cameron Smith, Melbourne Storm
Andrew Ryan, Canterbury Bulldogs

Dally M Representative Player of the Year
Winner:
Darren Lockyer, Queensland & Australia
Nominated:
Petero Civoniceva, Queensland & Australia
Johnathan Thurston, Queensland & Australia
Willie Mason, New South Wales & Australia

Dally M Coach of the Year
Winner:
Craig Bellamy, Melbourne Storm
Nominated:
Steve Folkes, Canterbury Bulldogs
Jason Taylor, Parramatta Eels
Matthew Elliott, Canberra Raiders

Peter Frilingos Memorial Award for the Headline Moment of the Year
Presented by David Penberthy, Editor of The Daily Telegraph
Winner:
Brett Finch's winning field goal, State of Origin Game I
Nominated:
Brett Stewart try against Wests Tigers
Queensland's State of Origin III comeback
St George Illawarra Dragons last minute victory over the Brisbane Broncos

Top Try Scorer
Winners:
Nathan Merritt, South Sydney Rabbitohs - 22 tries

Top Point Scorer
Winner:
Hazem El Masri, Canterbury Bulldogs - 296 points

Team of the Year
Best Fullback
Winner:
Clinton Schifcofske, Canberra Raiders
Nominated:
Greg Inglis, Melbourne Storm
Rhys Wesser, Penrith Panthers
Brett Stewart, Manly Warringah Sea Eagles

Best Winger
Winner:
Brian Carney, Newcastle Knights
Nominated:
Hazem El Masri, Canterbury Bulldogs
Eric Grothe, Parramatta Eels
Nathan Merritt, South Sydney Rabbitohs

Best Centre
Winner:
Mark Gasnier, St George Illawarra Dragons
Nominated:
Justin Hodges, Brisbane Broncos
Adam Mogg, Canberra Raiders
Matt Cooper, St George Illawarra Dragons
Jake Webster, Melbourne Storm

Best Five-Eighth
Winner:
Darren Lockyer, Brisbane Broncos
Nominated:
Scott Hill, Melbourne Storm
Jason Smith, Canberra Raiders
Preston Campbell, Penrith Panthers

Best Halfback
Winner:
Cooper Cronk, Melbourne Storm
Nominated:
Matt Orford, Manly Warringah Sea Eagles
Andrew Johns, Newcastle Knights
Johnathan Thurston, North Queensland Cowboys

Best Lock
Winner:
Ben Kennedy, Manly Warringah Sea Eagles
Nominated:
Alan Tongue, Canberra Raiders
Reni Maitua, Canterbury Bulldogs
Dallas Johnson, Melbourne Storm

Best Second Rower
Winner:
Nathan Hindmarsh, Parramatta Eels
Nominated:
Willie Mason, Canterbury Bulldogs
Steve Simpson, Newcastle Knights
Ryan Hoffman, Melbourne Storm

Best Prop
Winner:
Roy Asotasi, Canterbury Bulldogs
Nominated:
Luke Bailey, St George Illawarra Dragons
Petero Civoniceva, Brisbane Broncos
Mark O'Meley, Canterbury Bulldogs

Best Hooker
Winner:
Cameron Smith, Melbourne Storm

Hall of Fame Inductees
 Ken Kearney
 Sid Pearce
 Charles Fraser
 George Treweek
 Duncan Hall
 Peter Sterling

See also
Dally M Awards
Dally M Medal
National Rugby League season 2006

References

2006 sports awards
2006 NRL season
2006